Is My Head Still On? is the first album by Swedish band Tiger Lou.

Track listing
 Sound Of Crickets
 Sell Out
 Oh Horatio
 Warmth
 War Between Us
 Like You Said
 Last Night They Had To Carry Me Home
 Wake (Hooray Hooray)
 All In Good Time
 Lowdown

Videos
Videos were made for the tracks 'Oh Horatio' (which became MTV's 'Pick Of The Week') and 'Sell Out'.

2004 albums
Tiger Lou albums